Romeynshof is a station on line A of the Rotterdam Metro system, and is situated in Rotterdam-Ommoord. It is located between Graskruid station, where lines A and B split, and Binnenhof station, the northern terminus of line A.

Trains coming from Binnenhof will depart for Schiedam Centrum for most of the day. After 5 pm their destination will be Kralingse Zoom and at night Alexander.

This station was opened on 28 May 1983 when the East-West Line (also formerly the Caland line) was extended from its previous terminus Capelsebrug. It is on a section of line that uses overhead wires to provide traction power.

Rotterdam Metro stations
Railway stations opened in 1983
1983 establishments in the Netherlands
Railway stations in the Netherlands opened in the 20th century